Acridotarsa is a genus of moths belonging to the family Tineidae. The genus was described by Edward Meyrick in 1893.

The larvae are associated with termites' nests.

Species
Acridotarsa celsella (Walker, 1863) (Australia)
Acridotarsa conglomerata (Meyrick, 1922) (Australia)
Acridotarsa melipecta (Meyrick, 1915) (continental Africa & Africa)
Acridotarsa mylitis Meyrick, 1893 (Australia)
Acridotarsa nasutitermina (Silvestri) (Brazil)

Former species
Erechthias deloneura was formerly placed here too.

References

External links

Tineidae
Tineidae genera